Ndue Përlleshi (1908 – 29 August 1949) was a Kosovar-Albanian military leader, local and national hero, known as "Trimi I Dukagjinit". He was the Commander of the "Dukagjini Band" during World War II. On 8 March 1948, during the Battle of Bokshiq, Ndue Perlleshi, along Shaban Dema and Ndrec Nikolla, fought Montenegrin and Albanian communist forces numbering 600. Perlleshi killed 27 communists, and wounded many others, and both his comrades died. He survived with four wounds and returned to his home until Janko Boric, the local community leader, spotted him and threw a grenade through his window. Perlleshi quickly grabbed it and tossed it back to Boric wounding him. Ndue Perlleshi was killed on 29 August 1949 in Albania by the communist forces of Mehmet Shehu. Ndue Perlleshi is a much honoured hero amongst the Albanians of Dukagjin and Peja-region. He is mentioned in Albanian epic folklore.

References

1908 births
1949 deaths
Albanian anti-communists
Albanian collaborators with Nazi Germany
Albanian fascists
Albanian nationalists
Balli Kombëtar
Kosovan soldiers
20th-century Albanian people
Deaths by firearm in Albania